Clairefougère is a former commune in the Orne department in north-western France. In 2015, it became part of Montsecret-Clairefougère.

See also
Communes of the Orne department

References

Former communes of Orne